In music, Op. 7 stands for Opus number 7. Compositions that are assigned this number include:

 Barber – Music for a Scene from Shelley
 Beethoven – Piano Sonata No. 4
 Berlioz – Les nuits d'été
 Chopin – Mazurkas, Op. 7
 Clara Schumann – Piano Concerto
 Enescu – Octet
 Grieg – Piano Sonata
 Haas – String Quartet No. 2
 Handel – Organ concertos, Op. 7
 Jäger – Der Tod und das Mädchen
 Korngold – Der Ring des Polykrates
 Leifs – Organ Concerto
 Nielsen – Symphony No. 1
 Paganini – Violin Concerto No. 2
 Rachmaninoff – The Rock
 Schoenberg – String Quartets
 Schumann – Toccata
 Schütz – Musikalische Exequien
 Sibelius – Kullervo
 Stravinsky – Quatre études, Op. 7
 Vivaldi – Twelve Concertos, Op. 7
 Wagner – Schwarzschwanenreich